The Trouble-Makers is a 2003 Hong Kong drama film directed by Aman Chang in Cantonese. The movie has a run time of 84 minutes, and involves the actors Terence Yin, Sam Lee, and Maggie Q.

Plot summary
Maggie plays Clary who rents a room in a Chinese flat. Terence Yin from "Lara Croft Tomb Raider" plays the romantic lead who is transferred into this Chinese town. The landlord, the cop & Clary set up a scam to scare Yin out of the house by making him believe it is haunted so they can rent it again. Yin moves to his Aunt's house who also sets up a scam of accusing him of taking advantage his cousin so she can have an excuse to boot him out of the house. With nowhere to go, he returns to his flat to discover the first scam. Yin's buddies set up retro-scam and pretend to take advantage of Q. She then scams the scammers, which results in Yin taking care of a catatonic Clary. After the plot bounces back & forth a few times, the frame freezes just as Yin leans in for the big kiss.

Cast
Terence Yin
Sam Lee
Maggie Q
Lam Suet

References

External links
 
 The Trouble-Makers at LoveHKFilm

2003 drama films
2003 films
Films directed by Aman Chang
Hong Kong drama films
2000s Hong Kong films